Almirante Padilla Airport  is an airport serving the Caribbean coastal city of Riohacha in the Guajira Department of Colombia. It is served by Avianca, and formerly by Tiara Air and Viva Air Colombia. The airport is on the southwestern edge of the city.

Airlines and destinations 

The following airlines operate regular scheduled and charter flights at the airport:

See also
Transport in Colombia
List of airports in Colombia

References

External links 
OurAirports - Riohacha
FallingRain - Riohacha Airport

Airports in Colombia
Buildings and structures in La Guajira Department